In mathematics, an elliptic curve is a smooth, projective, algebraic curve of genus one, on which there is a specified point . If the field's characteristic is different from 2 and 3, then the curve can be described as a plane algebraic curve which consists of solutions  for:

The curve is required to be non-singular, which means that the curve has no cusps or self-intersections. It is always understood that the curve is really sitting in the projective plane, with the point  being the unique point at infinity. Many sources define an elliptic curve to be simply a curve given by an equation of this form.

An elliptic curve is an abelian variety – that is, it has a group law defined algebraically, with respect to which it is an abelian group – and  serves as the identity element.

If  has degree four and is square-free this equation again describes a plane curve of genus one; however, it has no natural choice of identity element. More generally, any algebraic curve of genus one, for example the intersection of two quadric surfaces embedded in three-dimensional projective space, is called an elliptic curve, provided that it is equipped with a marked point to act as the identity.

Using the theory of elliptic functions, it can be shown that elliptic curves defined over the complex numbers correspond to embeddings of the torus into the complex projective plane. The torus is also an abelian group, and this correspondence is also a group isomorphism.

Elliptic curves are especially important in number theory, and constitute a major area of current research; for example, they were used in Andrew Wiles's proof of Fermat's Last Theorem. They also find applications in elliptic curve cryptography (ECC) and integer factorization.

An elliptic curve is not an ellipse in the sense of a projective conic, which has genus zero: see elliptic integral for the origin of the term. However, there is a natural representation of real elliptic curves with shape invariant  as ellipses in the hyperbolic plane . Here, the vertex of the hyperboloid serves as the identity on each trajectory curve.

Topologically, a complex elliptic curve is a torus, while a complex ellipse is a sphere.

Elliptic curves over the real numbers

Although the formal definition of an elliptic curve requires some background in algebraic geometry, it is possible to describe some features of elliptic curves over the real numbers using only introductory algebra and geometry.

In this context, an elliptic curve is a plane curve defined by an equation of the form

This type of equation is called a Weierstrass equation, and said to be in Weierstrass form, or Weierstrass normal form.

The definition of elliptic curve also requires that the curve is non-singular. Geometrically, this means that the graph has no cusps, self-intersections, or isolated points. Algebraically, this holds if and only if the discriminant, is not equal to zero.

 

(Although the factor −16 is irrelevant to whether or not the curve is non-singular, this definition of the discriminant is useful in a more advanced study of elliptic curves.)

The real graph of a non-singular curve has two components if its discriminant is positive, and one component if it is negative. For example, in the graphs shown in figure to the right, the discriminant in the first case is 64, and in the second case is −368.

The group law
When working in the projective plane, the equation in homogeneous coordinates becomes :

This resulting equation is defined on the whole projective plane, and the curve it defines projects onto the elliptic curve of interest.  To find its intersection with the line at infinity, we can just posit .  This implies , which in a field means .   on the other hand can take any value thus all triplets  satisfy the equation.  In projective geometry this set is simply the point , which is thus the unique intersection of the curve with the line at infinity.

Since the curve is smooth, it can be shown that this point at infinity is the identity element of a group structure whose operation is geometrically described thereafter.

Since the curve is symmetrical about the -axis, given any point , we can take  to be the point opposite it. We then have , as  lies on the -plane, so that  is also the symmetrical of  about the origin, and thus represents the same projective point.

This will generally intersect the cubic at a third point, . We then take  to be , the point opposite .

This definition for addition works except in a few special cases related to the point at infinity and intersection multiplicity. Here, we define , making  the identity of the group. If  we only have one point, thus we cannot define the line between them. In this case, we use the tangent line to the curve at this point as our line. In most cases, the tangent will intersect a second point  and we can take its opposite.

Algebraic interpretation

The above groups can be described algebraically as well as geometrically.

which is equivalent to

and so must be the same polynomial.

and solving for the unknown . 

 follows from the line equation

If , then there are two options: if  (case 3), including the case where  (case 4), then the sum is defined as 0; thus, the inverse of each point on the curve is found by reflecting it across the -axis.

The slope is given by the tangent to the curve at (xP, yP).

Non-Weierstrass curves

For a cubic curve not in Weierstrass normal form, we can still define a group structure by designating one of its nine inflection points as the identity . In the projective plane, each line will intersect a cubic at three points when accounting for multiplicity.

Elliptic curves over the rational numbers
A curve E defined over the field of rational numbers is also defined over the field of real numbers. Therefore, the law of addition (of points with real coordinates) by the tangent and secant method can be applied to E. The explicit formulae show that the sum of two points P and Q with rational coordinates has again rational coordinates, since the line joining P and Q has rational coefficients. This way, one shows that the set of rational points of E forms a subgroup of the group of real points of E. As this group, it is an abelian group, that is, P + Q = Q + P.

Integral points
This section is concerned with points P = (x, y) of E such that x is an integer.

For example, the equation y2 = x3 + 17 has eight integral solutions with y > 0:
(x, y) = (−2, 3), (−1, 4), (2, 5), (4, 9), (8, 23), (43, 282), (52, 375),.

As another example, Ljunggren's equation, a curve whose Weierstrass form is y2 = x3 − 2x, has only four solutions with y ≥ 0 :
(x, y) = (0, 0), (−1, 1), (2, 2), (338).

The structure of rational points
Rational points can be constructed by the method of tangents and secants detailed above, starting with a finite number of rational points. More precisely the Mordell–Weil theorem states that the group E(Q) is a finitely generated (abelian) group. By the fundamental theorem of finitely generated abelian groups it is therefore a finite direct sum of copies of Z and finite cyclic groups.

The proof of the theorem involves two parts. The first part shows that for any integer m > 1, the quotient group E(Q)/mE(Q) is finite (this is the weak Mordell–Weil theorem). Second, introducing a height function h on the rational points E(Q) defined by h(P0) = 0 and  if P (unequal to the point at infinity P0) has as abscissa the rational number x = p/q (with coprime p and q). This height function h has the property that h(mP) grows roughly like the square of m. Moreover, only finitely many rational points with height smaller than any constant exist on E.

Redoing the same with P1, that is to say P1 = 2P2 + Q2, then P2 = 2P3 + Q3, etc. finally expresses P as an integral linear combination of points Qi and of points whose height is bounded by a fixed constant chosen in advance: by the weak Mordell–Weil theorem and the second property of the height function P is thus expressed as an integral linear combination of a finite number of fixed points. 

The theorem however doesn't provide a method to determine any representatives of E(Q)/mE(Q).

The rank of E(Q), that is the number of copies of Z in E(Q) or, equivalently, the number of independent points of infinite order, is called the rank of E. The Birch and Swinnerton-Dyer conjecture is concerned with determining the rank. One conjectures that it can be arbitrarily large, even if only examples with relatively small rank are known. The elliptic curve with the currently largest exactly-known rank is
y2 + xy + y = x3 − x2 − x + 

It has rank 20, found by Noam Elkies and Zev Klagsbrun in 2020. Curves of rank higher than 20 have been known since 1994, with lower bounds on their ranks ranging from 21 to 28, but their exact ranks are not known and in particular it is not proven which of them have higher rank than the others or which is the true "current champion".

As for the groups constituting the torsion subgroup of E(Q), the following is known: the torsion subgroup of E(Q) is one of the 15 following groups (a theorem due to Barry Mazur): Z/NZ for N = 1, 2, ..., 10, or 12, or Z/2Z × Z/2NZ with N = 1, 2, 3, 4. Examples for every case are known. Moreover, elliptic curves whose Mordell–Weil groups over Q have the same torsion groups belong to a parametrized family.

The Birch and Swinnerton-Dyer conjecture

The Birch and Swinnerton-Dyer conjecture (BSD) is one of the Millennium problems of the Clay Mathematics Institute. The conjecture relies on analytic and arithmetic objects defined by the elliptic curve in question.

At the analytic side, an important ingredient is a function of a complex variable, L, the Hasse–Weil zeta function of E over Q. This function is a variant of the Riemann zeta function and Dirichlet L-functions. It is defined as an Euler product, with one factor for every prime number p.

For a curve E over Q given by a minimal equation

with integral coefficients , reducing the coefficients modulo p defines an elliptic curve over the finite field Fp (except for a finite number of primes p, where the reduced curve has a singularity and thus fails to be elliptic, in which case E is said to be of bad reduction at p).

The zeta function of an elliptic curve over a finite field Fp is, in some sense, a generating function assembling the information of the number of points of E with values in the finite field extensions Fpn of Fp. It is given by

The interior sum of the exponential resembles the development of the logarithm and, in fact, the so-defined zeta function is a rational function:

or equivalently,

.

We may define the same quantities and functions over an arbitrary finite field of characteristic , with  replacing  everywhere.

The L-function of E over Q is then defined by collecting this information together, for all primes p. It is defined by

where N is the conductor of E, i.e. the product of primes with bad reduction, in which case ap is defined differently from the method above: see Silverman (1986) below.

This product converges for Re(s) > 3/2 only. Hasse's conjecture affirms that the L-function admits an analytic continuation to the whole complex plane and satisfies a functional equation relating, for any s, L(E, s) to L(E, 2 − s). In 1999 this was shown to be a consequence of the proof of the Shimura–Taniyama–Weil conjecture, which asserts that every elliptic curve over Q is a modular curve, which implies that its L-function is the L-function of a modular form whose analytic continuation is known. One can therefore speak about the values of L(E, s) at any complex number s.

At s=1 (the conductor product can be discarded as it is finite), the L-function becomes

The Birch and Swinnerton-Dyer conjecture relates the arithmetic of the curve to the behaviour of this L-function at s = 1. It affirms that the vanishing order of the L-function at s = 1 equals the rank of E and predicts the leading term of the Laurent series of L(E, s) at that point in terms of several quantities attached to the elliptic curve.

Much like the Riemann hypothesis, the truth of the BSD conjecture would have multiple consequences, including the following two:
 A congruent number is defined as an odd square-free integer n which is the area of a right triangle with rational side lengths. It is known that n is a congruent number if and only if the elliptic curve  has a rational point of infinite order; assuming BSD, this is equivalent to its L-function having a zero at s = 1. Tunnell has shown a related result: assuming BSD, n is a congruent number if and only if the number of triplets of integers (x, y, z) satisfying  is twice the number of triples satisfying . The interest in this statement is that the condition is easy to check.
In a different direction, certain analytic methods allow for an estimation of the order of zero in the center of the critical strip for certain L-functions. Admitting BSD, these estimations correspond to information about the rank of families of the corresponding elliptic curves.

Elliptic curves over finite fields

Let K = Fq be the finite field with q elements and E an elliptic curve defined over K. While the precise number of rational points of an elliptic curve E over K is in general difficult to compute, Hasse's theorem on elliptic curves gives the following inequality:

In other words, the number of points on the curve grows proportionally to the number of elements in the field. This fact can be understood and proven with the help of some general theory; see local zeta function and étale cohomology for example.

The set of points E(Fq) is a finite abelian group. It is always cyclic or the product of two cyclic groups, depending whether q is even or odd. For example, the curve defined by

over F71 has 72 points (71 affine points including (0,0) and one point at infinity) over this field, whose group structure is given by Z/2Z × Z/36Z. The number of points on a specific curve can be computed with Schoof's algorithm.

Studying the curve over the field extensions of Fq is facilitated by the introduction of the local zeta function of E over Fq, defined by a generating series (also see above)

where the field Kn is the (unique up to isomorphism) extension of K = Fq of degree n (that is,  Fqn).

The zeta function is a rational function in T. To see this, the integer  such that

has an associated complex number  such that

where  is the complex conjugate.

Then , so finally

For example, the zeta function of E : y2 + y = x3 over the field F2 is given by

which follows from:

The functional equation is

and so

which leads directly to the local L-functions

The Sato–Tate conjecture is a statement about how the error term  in Hasse's theorem varies with the different primes q, if an elliptic curve E over Q is reduced modulo q. It was proven (for almost all such curves) in 2006 due to the results of Taylor, Harris and Shepherd-Barron, and says that the error terms are equidistributed.

Elliptic curves over finite fields are notably applied in cryptography and for the factorization of large integers. These algorithms often make use of the group structure on the points of E. Algorithms that are applicable to general groups, for example the group of invertible elements in finite fields, F*q, can thus be applied to the group of points on an elliptic curve. For example, the discrete logarithm is such an algorithm. The interest in this is that choosing an elliptic curve allows for more flexibility than choosing q (and thus the group of units in Fq). Also, the group structure of elliptic curves is generally more complicated.

Elliptic curves over a general field
Elliptic curves can be defined over any field K; the formal definition of an elliptic curve is a non-singular projective algebraic curve over K with genus 1 and endowed with a distinguished point defined over K.

If the characteristic of K is neither 2 nor 3, then every elliptic curve over K can be written in the form

after a linear change of variables. Here p and q are elements of K such that the right hand side polynomial x3 − px − q does not have any double roots. If the characteristic is 2 or 3, then more terms need to be kept: in characteristic 3, the most general equation is of the form

for arbitrary constants b2, b4, b6 such that the polynomial on the right-hand side has distinct roots (the notation is chosen for historical reasons).  In characteristic 2, even this much is not possible, and the most general equation is

provided that the variety it defines is non-singular. If characteristic were not an obstruction, each equation would reduce to the previous ones by a suitable linear change of variables.

One typically takes the curve to be the set of all points (x,y) which satisfy the above equation and such that both x and y are elements of the algebraic closure of K. Points of the curve whose coordinates both belong to K are called K-rational points.

Many of the preceding results remain valid when the field of definition of E is a number field K, that is to say, a finite field extension of Q. In particular, the group E(K) of K-rational points of an elliptic curve E defined over K is finitely generated, which generalizes the Mordell–Weil theorem above. A theorem due to Loïc Merel shows that for a given integer d, there are (up to isomorphism) only finitely many groups that can occur as the torsion groups of E(K) for an elliptic curve defined over a number field K of degree d. More precisely, there is a number B(d) such that for any elliptic curve E defined over a number field K of degree d, any torsion point of E(K) is of order less than B(d). The theorem is effective: for d > 1, if a torsion point is of order p, with p prime, then

As for the integral points, Siegel's theorem generalizes to the following: Let E be an elliptic curve defined over a number field K, x and y the Weierstrass coordinates. Then there are only finitely many points of E(K) whose x-coordinate is in the ring of integers OK.

The properties of the Hasse–Weil zeta function and the Birch and Swinnerton-Dyer conjecture can also be extended to this more general situation.

Elliptic curves over the complex numbers

The formulation of elliptic curves as the embedding of a torus in the complex projective plane follows naturally from a curious property of Weierstrass's elliptic functions.  These functions and their first derivative are related by the formula

It should be clear that this relation is in the form of an elliptic curve (over the complex numbers). The Weierstrass functions are doubly periodic; that is, they are periodic with respect to a lattice ; in essence, the Weierstrass functions are naturally defined on a torus  . This torus may be embedded in the complex projective plane by means of the map

This map is a group isomorphism of the torus (considered with its natural group structure) with the chord-and-tangent group law on the cubic curve which is the image of this map.  It is also an isomorphism of Riemann surfaces from the torus to the cubic curve, so topologically, an elliptic curve is a torus.  If the lattice  is related by multiplication by a non-zero complex number  to a lattice , then the corresponding curves are isomorphic. Isomorphism classes of elliptic curves are specified by the -invariant.

The isomorphism classes can be understood in a simpler way as well. However, all real polynomials factorize completely into linear factors over the complex numbers, since the field of complex numbers is the algebraic closure of the reals. So, the elliptic curve may be written as

One finds that

and

In fact, it yields the integer . 

In contrast, the modular discriminant

is generally a transcendental number. In particular, the value of the Dedekind eta function  is

Note that the uniformization theorem implies that every compact Riemann surface of genus one can be represented as a torus.

If

is an elliptic curve over the complex numbers and

then a pair of fundamental periods of  can be calculated very rapidly by

When , there is an additional condition that .

Over the complex numbers, every elliptic curve has nine inflection points. Every line through two of these points also passes through a third inflection point; the nine points and 12 lines formed in this way form a realization of the Hesse configuration.

Algorithms that use elliptic curves
Elliptic curves over finite fields are used in some cryptographic applications as well as for integer factorization. Typically, the general idea in these applications is that a known algorithm which makes use of certain finite groups is rewritten to use the groups of rational points of elliptic curves. For more see also:
 Elliptic curve cryptography
 Elliptic-curve Diffie–Hellman key exchange
 Supersingular isogeny key exchange
Elliptic curve digital signature algorithm
 EdDSA digital signature algorithm
 Dual EC DRBG random number generator
 Lenstra elliptic-curve factorization
 Elliptic curve primality proving

Alternative representations of elliptic curves
 Hessian curve
 Edwards curve
 Twisted curve
 Twisted Hessian curve
 Twisted Edwards curve
 Doubling-oriented Doche–Icart–Kohel curve
 Tripling-oriented Doche–Icart–Kohel curve
 Jacobian curve
 Montgomery curve

See also
 Arithmetic dynamics
 Elliptic algebra
 Elliptic surface
 Comparison of computer algebra systems
 Isogeny
 j-line
 Level structure (algebraic geometry)
 Modularity theorem
 Moduli stack of elliptic curves
 Nagell–Lutz theorem
 Riemann–Hurwitz formula
 Wiles's proof of Fermat's Last Theorem

Notes

References
Serge Lang, in the introduction to the book cited below, stated that "It is possible to write endlessly on elliptic curves. (This is not a threat.)" The following short list is thus at best a guide to the vast expository literature available on the theoretical, algorithmic, and cryptographic aspects of elliptic curves.
 
 , winner of the MAA writing prize the George Pólya Award
 
 

   Chapter XXV

External links

 LMFDB: Database of Elliptic Curves over Q
 
 
 The Arithmetic of elliptic curves from PlanetMath
 Interactive elliptic curve over R and over Zp – web application that requires HTML5 capable browser.

 
Analytic number theory
Group theory